In enzymology, a polyvinyl-alcohol dehydrogenase (acceptor) is an enzyme that catalyzes the chemical reaction

polyvinyl alcohol + acceptor  oxidized polyvinyl alcohol + reduced acceptor

Thus, the two substrates of this enzyme are polyvinyl alcohol and acceptor, whereas its two products are oxidized polyvinyl alcohol and reduced acceptor.

This enzyme belongs to the family of oxidoreductases, specifically those acting on the CH-OH group of donor with other acceptors.  The systematic name of this enzyme class is polyvinyl-alcohol:acceptor oxidoreductase. Other names in common use include PVA dehydrogenase, and polyvinyl-alcohol:(acceptor) oxidoreductase.  It employs one cofactor, PQQ.

References

 
 

EC 1.1.99
Pyrroloquinoline quinone enzymes
Enzymes of unknown structure